Huang Zhipeng (born March 27, 1984 in Jinan, Shandong) is a Chinese sprint canoer. He competed in the late 2000s. At the 2008 Summer Olympics in Beijing, he finished eighth in the K-2 1000 m event while being eliminated in the heats of the K-2 500 m event.  At the 2012 Summer Olympics, he finished 10th in the men's K-4 1000 m.

References

External links 
Sports-Reference.com - Huang Zhipeng profile

1984 births
Living people
Sportspeople from Jinan
Canoeists from Shandong
Olympic canoeists of China
Canoeists at the 2008 Summer Olympics
Canoeists at the 2012 Summer Olympics
Asian Games medalists in canoeing
Canoeists at the 2010 Asian Games
Chinese male canoeists
Medalists at the 2010 Asian Games
Asian Games gold medalists for China